Pirot is a city and the administrative center of the Pirot District in southeastern Serbia. According to 2011 census, the urban area of the city has a population of 38,785, while the population of the city administrative area has 57,928 inhabitants.

The city has rich geographical features, including the mountains of Stara Planina, Vlaška Planina, Belava, Suva Planina; rivers which flow through the town, including Nišava, Jerma, Rasnička Reka, Temštica and the Visočica; and four lakes, the Zavoj Lake, Berovacko Lake, Krupac Lake and Sukovo Lake.

It also has a rich culture, with notable Orthodox church buildings, including the Church of St. Petka, and the monastery of St. Georges and St. John the Theologian from the late 14th century, both of which display an example of medieval architecture. Pirot is known for its traditional woven carpet, the Pirot carpet (Pirot ćilim).

Geography
According to the 2002 census report, in the municipality of Pirot lived 63791 residents. Around 45,000 people live in the city itself and about 22,000 people live in the villages around the city.

The river Nišava divides the Pirot into two districts: Tijabara and Pazar.

Pirot has several mountains in the vicinity, including Stara Planina, Vlaška planina, Belava, and Suva Planina.

The following rivers flow through Pirot: the Nišava, Jerma, Rasnička Reka, Temštica, and Visočica. Pirot also has four lakes: Lake Zavoj, Lake Berovacko, Lake Krupac, and Lake Sukov.

Pirot has a humid subtropical climate (Köppen climate classification: Cfa) with hot summers and cold winters.

History

Roman era
During the rule of Roman Emperor Tiberius (14–37), Ponišavlje was part of Moesia, and during Vespasian (69–79) it was, as the rest of Serbia, organized into Upper Moesia (as opposed to most of Bulgaria, Lower Moesia). At the end of the 4th century the basin of the Nišava was organized into the province of Dacia Mediterranea. The Roman settlement of Turres (Latin for "towers"), which was a military residence, is mentioned in the first half of the 3rd century. Later, the Byzantine town of Quimedava is mentioned here, with remains that have survived.

The town was set to enable control and defence of the main road in this part of the empire. Besides, travellers could sleep here overnight, as well as get refreshments and new horses or vehicles. In time, the settlement advanced because of the important road passing through. It was also disturbed very persistently by invasions of the Gothic tribes throughout the 4th century, as well as the Huns in the 5th century.

Early Byzantine era
According to the written accounts On Buildings by Procopius of Caesarea, writing during the reign of the emperor Justinian I (527 – 565), the emperor ordered the reconstruction of thirty fortresses in the area from Niš to Sofia, including the towers of Pirot. He also gave the detailed description of those construction works. In times when the Slavs and Avars were invading the Balkans, the settlement was named Quimedava, and was situated on the southern slope of the Sarlah Hill.

Corresponding to the archaeological investigations, the town back then, surrounded by forts and fortified walls, also included an early Christian basilica, thermae (public baths), a necropolis, and other facilities. Beside the military fortress, a civil settlement (vicus) existed on the site called Majilka. By the late 6th century and early 7th century, successive barbarian invasions had broken through the Byzantine Danube frontier, and Slavs settled in large numbers across the Balkans.

Middle Ages
 
By the mid-6th century Slavs had settled the area. In 679 the Bulgars crossed the Danube into Lower Moesia, and eventually expand to the west and south. Since the beginning of the 9th century the region of Pirot is part of the First Bulgarian State. The Byzantine emperor Basil II (r. 960–1025) reconquered the Balkans from the Bulgars.

In 1153, Arab geographer Burizi crossed the country, and recorded the place of Atrubi at the site of old Turres, describing it as situated by a small river which arrives from the Serbian mountains and was a tributary of the Morava. In 1182–83 the Serbian army led by Grand Prince Stefan Nemanja conquered Byzantine territories from Niš to Sofia. The Serbians were expelled by the Byzantine emperor Isaac II Angelus in 1190. Pirot and Bela Palanka (Remesiana) were not mentioned as they were in ruin since the rebellions in the 940s. Since the end of the 12th century the region of Pirot was part of the restored Bulgarian state. The region was for some time in the domains of Bulgarian noble sevastokrator Kaloyan. In 1331-1332 Church of St. Petka in Staničenje was built - at the time of Bulgarian Emperor Joan Asen (Ivan Alexander) and Vidin master Belaur.

Some authors suggest that during the 1370s the region of Pirot was included in the Serbian state. Pirot was part of Prince Lazar's state, in which it was an important strategical point. The city was captured by the Ottomans in 1386. The name of the city, Pirot, dates to the 14th century and is derived from Greek pirgos ("tower").

Ottoman rule
At the beginning of the 15th century, the region of Pirot was one of the centres of the Uprising of Konstantin and Fruzhin. A significant blow to the efforts of the Bulgarian princes for the restoration of the Bulgarian state was imposed by the Ottoman ruler Sulejman, who conquered the Bulgarian fortress of Temsko, near today's village of Temska, to the north of Pirot.

Its Turkish name, Şehirköy (meaning "city, town village"), is first mentioned in 1443. It was organized into the Sanjak of Niš. In 1469, the body of Serbian king Stefan Milutin was transferred via Pirot. In 1561, hieromonk Isaija from Pirot visited Hilandar where he contributed a book. Hilandar had dependencies in Pirot up until the 19th century. Travel writer Stephen Gerlach (fl. 1578) recorded that Pirot Christians claimed that the town was the earlier estate of Miloš Obilić, the slayer of Sultan Murad at Kosovo. He also noted that Pirot was a significant place in Bulgaria. In 1659, Austrian deputy August von Mayern visited the town and described it as "Schiarchici, a town called by the Orthodox as Pirot, but is not surrounded by walls and inhabited by Turks and Rascians" (Rasciani according to the author were even the citizens of Sofia, Ihtiman etc.). In 1664, Austrian deputy Leslie and English nobleman John Burberry visited the town, the latter noting that there were three churches, one of which was earlier Dominican. In 1688 Ottoman renegade Yegen Pasha resided in the town.

During the Great Turkish War, after taking Niš on 25 September 1689, Austrian general Piccolomini with his army of Serb volunteers and some Germans chased Turks towards Sofia. Arriving at Pirot, the town was empty of Turks, and he reported that the town was in flames and some parts in ash. In August 1690 a large Ottoman army took Pirot, defended only by 100 Germans, and then besieged Niš, taking it after three weeks. Hungarian detachments retreating via Temska ravaged the monastery and terrorized the surrounding population, as inscribed by a priest on the church walls. That year, many locals fled northwards with Patriarch Arsenije III.

During the Austro-Turkish War (1737–39) the Austrian army took Pirot on 23 July 1737. In 1739, upon Ottoman return, the town was burnt down and its churches destroyed (one transformed into a mosque). 140 houses were burnt down which is evidence that hajduks of the region participated. Many locals from the region fled northwards with Patriarch Arsenije IV.

The first known literary monument, influenced by Torlakian dialects is the Manuscript from Temska Monastery from 1762, in which its author, the Monk Kiril Zhivkovich from Pirot, considered his language as "simple Bulgarian".

In 1768, the town is described as half in ruins. From 1761 to 1878, Pirot was the seat of the Metropolitan of Nišava.
 
In 1806, during the First Serbian Uprising (1804–13), Hajduk-Veljko attacked Bela Palanka. Ibrahim Pasha, unable to enter Serbia cross Aleksinac and Deligrad, planned to attack from Pirot and Lom with the intent to clash with the Serbian army before Niš; the Serbian army went to stop this and defeated him in the mountains between Pirot, Knjaževac and Chiprovtsi. Rebel leaders from Pirot included Mita and Marinko, who were tasked to defend the border towards Pirot (in Ottoman hands). After the Serbian Revolution, some of the population in the area migrated to avoid Ottoman retribution. It was estimated in 1836 that there were 6–8,000 inhabitants. Carpetry was the main occupation, there were many shops and cafés in the centre, the population was mixed, and it was the domain of the sister of the Sultan. On 24 May 1836 a rebellion broke out in the town, which was suppressed by early June, and then another one broke out in August, also unsuccessful. The rebels corresponded with Prince Miloš Obrenović. The Niš Uprising (1841), which included the Pirot area, was also suppressed by the Ottomans. In 1846–1864 Pirot was administratively part of the Niš Eyalet.

Jérôme-Adolphe Blanqui, traveling across Bulgaria in 1841, describes the population of the Sanjak of Niš as Bulgarians. In the 19th century Johann Georg von Hahn stated that the Christian population of Pirot is Bulgarian. Philipp Kanitz claimed that some inhabitants "Did not imagine that six years later the cursed Turkish rule in their city would end, and even less, because they always felt that they are Bulgarians, that they would belong to the Principality of Serbia".

Modern history

On 16 December 1877, during the Serbian-Ottoman War (1876–1877), the Serbian army entered Pirot. Pirot and its region were part of liberated Bulgaria according to Treaty of San Stefano. The Treaty of Berlin (1878) saw Pirot and Vranje ceded to Serbia. A part of the local Bulgarians left the town and settled in Bulgaria.

The 1879 Serbian regional population census registered that Pirot had a population of 76,892 people, and 11,005 households. It was temporarily occupied by the Bulgarian army after the Serbo-Bulgarian War, between 15 November and 15 December 1885 [O.S.]. During World War I, the Bulgarian army entered Pirot on 14 October 1915 and occupied the city as well as the whole Pomoravlje region.

In the Interwar period, the Internal Western Outland Revolutionary Organization engaged in repeated attacks against the Yugoslav police and army. From 1929 to 1941, Pirot was part of the Morava Banovina of the Kingdom of Yugoslavia. During World War II Bulgaria occupied the so-called Western Outlands, as well as Pirot and Vranje. After the Second World War, these regions were returned to Yugoslavia. After the dissolution of Yugoslavia, these areas remained within the Serbian state.

Pirot was granted city status in February 2016.

Settlements
Aside from the city of Pirot itself, the city territory covers over 70 settlements:

Bazovik
Barje Čiflik
Basara
Bela
Berilovac
Berovica
Blato
Brlog
Velika Lukanja
Veliki Jovanovac
Veliki Suvodol
Veliko Selo
Visočka Ržana
Vlasi
Vojnegovac
Vranište
Gnjilan
Gornja Držina
Gostuša
Gradašnica
Gradište
Dobri Do
Dojkinci
Držina
Zaskovci
Izvor
Jalbotina
Jelovica
Kamik
Koprivštica
Kostur
Krupac
Kumanovo
Mali Jovanovac
Mali Suvodol
Milojkovac
Mirkovci
Nišor
Novi Zavoj
Obrenovac
Oreovica
Orlja
Osmakova
Pakleštica
Pasjač
Petrovac
Planinica
Pokrevenik
Poljska Ržana
Ponor
Prisjan
Ragodeš
Rasnica
Rosomač
Rsovci
Rudinje
Sinja Glava
Slavinja
Sopot
Srećkovac
Staničenje
Sukovo
Temska
Topli Do
Trnjana
Cerev Del
Cerova
Crvenčevo
Crnoklište
Činiglavci
Šugrin

Demographics

According to the 2011 census results, the city of Pirot has a population of 57,928 inhabitants.

Ethnic groups
The ethnic composition of the municipality:

Culture
Notable brands of Pirot include the Pirot carpet, Pirot opanak, Pirot cheese, and ironed sausage.

Tourist attractions
 Pirot Fortress, dating to the 14th-century Serbian Empire
 Temska Monastery, 16th-century Orthodox monastery
 Zavoj Lake
 National Park Old Mountain
 Mountain home

Economy
On the territory of the city of Pirot operates tire manufacturer Tigar Tyres which is one of top Serbian exporters in the period from 2013 to 2017. As of September 2017, Pirot has one of 14 free economic zones established in Serbia.

The following table gives a preview of total number of registered people employed in legal entities per their core activity (as of 2018):

Gallery

Notable people

 Dragutin Gostuški, Serbian composer, musicologist and art historian
 Dobrosav Živković, illustrator and caricaturist
 Zoran Đorđević, football manager
 Svetislav Pešić, basketball coach and former player
 Nikola Đurđić, Serbian football player
 Krastyo Krastev, writer and translator, notable as the first Bulgarian literary critic

References

Sources

External links

 

 
Populated places in Pirot District
Municipalities and cities of Southern and Eastern Serbia